Harry Bertie Haslam (22 November 1875 – 1943) was an English footballer who played in the Football League for Derby County.

References

1875 births
1943 deaths
English footballers
Association football midfielders
English Football League players
Gresley F.C. players
Belper Town F.C. players
Derby County F.C. players